Christine Fong Kwok-shan (born 28 March 1966) is an engineer and politician in Hong Kong, as well as a former child actress. She is a current member of the Sai Kung District Council.

Early life and career
Fong was a child actress at ATV in the 1980s. Actor Bowie Wu is her godfather. She got famous from her role, Nezha, in the 1986 TV series The Boy Fighter from Heaven, and is nicknamed after the role. After she graduated from the University of Hawaii with a bachelor's degree in Business Administration, she obtained the qualification of a building engineer and worked as secretary of Cheung Yan-lung, a powerful rural leader.

District councillor 
She joined the Liberal Party in 2004 and served as the chairman of the New Territories East Branch until 2010 when she quit the Liberals and formed Professional Power. She was appointed to the Sai Kung District Council in 2008 and elected to the Council through the new Wan Po constituency in the 2011 election with high votes.

She has been outspoken against the government's plan of the extension of the Tseung Kwan O landfill which is located in her constituency. She also launched a 35-hour fast outside the Legislative Council building to protest against the landfill extensions in 2013.

Fong was also involved in an assault case against Elizabeth Quat, a Legislative Councillor of the Democratic Alliance for the Betterment and Progress of Hong Kong (DAB), when Fong and a group of protestors confronted Quat in a protest against the extension of the Tseung Kwan O landfill. She was later found not guilty of the charge on 22 February 2016.

In 2015 election, she was re-elected through the new Wan Po North constituency which was split from her original constituency after a boundary review.  She clung on to her seat in 2019 District Council elections in Hong Kong by 170 votes, following a rout of pro-Beijing candidates amidst the 2019–20 Hong Kong protests.

Bids for Legislative Council 

She ran for the 2012 Legislative Council election in New Territories East, receiving 24,594 votes, about 4,000 votes short for claiming a seat.

In the 2016 New Territories East by-election, she finished fourth place in the election by receiving 33,424 votes, around 8,000 more than the 2012 election.

Fong ran for the New Territories East multi-seat constituency again in the 2016 Hong Kong legislative election and came 10th, falling short of the lowest-ranking winner Leung Kwok-hung by about 1000 votes.

Political stance 
Fong and Professional Power have been widely considered as a centrist political faction. They have competed directly with both the pro-Beijing camp and the pro-democracy camp. In the 2016 Hong Kong legislative election, it was reported that the Hong Kong Liaison Office tried to persuade pro-Beijing campaigners to "allocate" tactical votes to Fong without success.

In 2019 Hong Kong local elections, many candidates of the Professional Power were not challenged by any parties or independent politicians from the pro-Beijing camp. Prior to the polling day, there was a list widely circulated in LIHKG and Factcheck.io. The list claimed itself as a list of candidates endorsed by Hong Kong Federation of Trade Unions. The list included six candidates from the Professional Power.

References

1966 births
Living people
University of Hawaiʻi alumni
Hong Kong engineers
20th-century Hong Kong actresses
Liberal Party (Hong Kong) politicians
District councillors of Sai Kung District